Bossk can refer to:

Bossk (band), a post-metal band from Kent
Bossk (Star Wars), a character from the Star Wars franchise